Ville Petteri Vähämäki (born March 30, 1979) is a Finnish politician, representing the Finns Party in the Parliament of Finland since 2011. He has been elected to the Parliament from the Oulu constituency in 2011 with 5,534 votes and 2015 with 3,798 votes.

References

External links
 Home page of Ville Vähämäki

1979 births
Living people
People from Veteli
Finns Party politicians
Members of the Parliament of Finland (2011–15)
Members of the Parliament of Finland (2015–19)
Members of the Parliament of Finland (2019–23)